Portage Township Schools is a public school district based in Portage, Indiana. Its boundaries are the same as Portage Township and includes the city of Portage, the town of Ogden Dunes and unincorporated areas including South Haven.

Schools
There are 11 schools in the system.

Portage High School
Fegley Middle School 
Willowcreek Middle School
Aylesworth Elementary School 
Central Elementary School 
Crisman Elementary School 
Jones Elementary School 
Kyle Elementary School 
Myers Elementary School 
Saylor Elementary School 
South Haven Elementary School

References

External links
 

School districts in Indiana
Education in Porter County, Indiana